John William Albaugh Sr. (September 30, 1837 – February 11, 1909), was an American actor and manager.

Born in Baltimore, Maryland, it was there that Albaugh made his first real appearance on the stage as the title character in a play called Brutus, or the Fall of Tarquin (1855), on a stage managed by Joseph Jefferson. Of his many subsequent impersonations, perhaps the best-known is that of Louis XI, at what later became Daly's Theatre in New York. After 1868 he was manager of theatres in St. Louis, New Orleans, and Albany. John was the sole lessee and manager of the Albaugh's Grand Opera House (1884–1894) in Washington, where he also built the Lafayette Square Opera House. He owned the new Lyceum Theatre in Baltimore, where he made his last appearance in 1899 before retiring from the stage.

Albaugh died at the home of his daughter in Jersey City from heart disease. His son John Albaugh Jr. (1867–1910) was also an actor and stage manager.

References
General references
 Players of the Present (see Part I, pps. 9 & 254), by John Bouvé Clapp (1855–1923) & Edwin Francis Edgett (1867–1946), De Vinne Press (publisher) for the members of The Dunlap Society, New York (1899–1901)  &  Part I, Dunlap Society New Series Publication No. 9 (1899)Part II, Dunlap Society New Series Publication No. 11 (1900)Part III, Dunlap Society New Series Publication No. 13 (1901)Extra Volume (1902) 
 The National Cyclopaedia of American Biography, Volume 2, James T. White & Co. (James Terry White), New York (1891) 
 Who Was Who in America, A component Volume of Who's Who in American History, Volume 1, 1897–1942, A.N. Marquis Co., Chicago (1943) 
 Notable Names in the American Theatre, James T. White & Co., Clifton, New Jersey (1976)
 The Oxford Companion to American Theatre, First edition, by Gerald Martin Bordman (1931–2011), Oxford University Press, New York (1984)
 Who's Who on the Stage; The Dramatic Reference Book and Biographical Dictionary of the Theatre, Walter Lyman Browne (1856–1911) & Frederick Arnold Austin (1875–1961), editors & publishers, New York (1906)
 Who's Who on the Stage; The Dramatic Reference Book and Biographical Dictionary of the Theatre, edited by Walter Lyman Browne (1856–1911) & Emanuel DeRoy Koch (1887–1975), B.W. Dodge & Co. (Benjamin Wales Dodge; 1862–1917), New York (1908)

Inline citations

External links

1837 births
1909 deaths
19th-century American male actors
American male stage actors
American theatre managers and producers
Male actors from Baltimore
19th-century American businesspeople